Diverse Vinyl is a record store and independent record label based in Newport, Wales. It is the UK's largest retailer of new vinyl records.

History 

It was established in 1995 by Paul Hawkins. Having opened as an LP mail order department, "a time when vinyl was in its darkest days". Hawkins has described being (at the time) one of the only South Wales record stores with a wide enough range of vinyl records, with only Spillers Records in Cardiff (the oldest surviving store in the world) serving for regional competition.

During the period, similar businesses including Rough Trade Records faced closure, with the growth of CD and later digital audio rendering vinyl recordings expensive and inefficient.

Modern era 

In 2002, the store started its independent record label, Diverse Records, which has gone on to release over 50 records, including the first vinyl printing of an Alison Krauss record, as well as popular bands including Idlewild and modern names like Laura Marling.

In recent years, the store has enjoyed a revival, along with the 2000s vinyl revival. The store and others has been particularly helped by the establishment of Record Store Day, which has brought attention, business, and events to local record stores across the UK.

In April 2019, the business re-launched its website, which has served as one of the largest online retailers of LPs.

The same month, for Record Store Day 2019 the store enjoyed queues of 80 people before opening, as people travelled from around the UK to the city. Music was performed both at the store as well as live venues across the city, from The Murenger, Tiny Rebel Urban Taphouse, Newport Market's Gallery Space, Le Public Space, McCann's Rock 'n' Ale Bar, and Slipping Jimmy's.

Artists 
Acts published by Diverse Records include:

 Adrian Sherwood
 Alison Krauss
 Amy Duncan
 Carrie Rodriguez
 Chuck Prophet
 Cowboy Junkies
 Daniel Lanois
 Danny and the Champions of the World
 Dolly Varden
 Eddi Reader
 Eleanor McEvoy
 Fionn Regan
 Georgia Ruth
 Gretchen Peters
 Heartworn Highways
 Idlewild
 Joan Baez
 Kris Drever
 Lau
 Laura Marling
 Loudon Wainwright III
 Mark Olson
 Paper Aeroplanes
 Polly Paulusma
 Richard Thompson
 Richmond Fontaine
 Rickie Lee Jones
 Roddy Woomble
 Ron Sexsmith
 Simone Felice
 The Boo Radleys
 The Webb Sisters
 The Duke & The King
 Dr John & The Lower 911
 Frank Black & The Catholics

See also 
 Music of Newport
 Music of Wales
 Newport, Wales
 Welsh music
 Newport city centre
 TJ's
 El Sieco's
 Le Pub
 Weeping Angels

References

External links 

 
 

Newport, Wales
Culture in Newport, Wales
Landmarks in Newport, Wales
Music venues in Newport, Wales
Record labels established in 2002
Alternative rock record labels
Indie rock record labels
British independent record labels